Hinduism is a minority religion in Japan, which is followed by nearly 133,240 (0.1%) people as per 2022. Most of the Hindus in Japan are from India and Nepal.

Cultural

Although Hinduism is a little-practiced religion in Japan, it has still had a significant, but indirect role in the formation of Japanese culture. This is mostly because many Buddhist beliefs and traditions (which share a common Indian root with Hinduism) spread to Japan from China via Korean peninsula in the 6th century. One indication of this is the Japanese "Seven Gods of Fortune", of which four originated as Hindu deities: Benzaitensama (Sarasvati), Bishamon (Vaiśravaṇa or Kubera), Daikokuten (Mahākāla/Shiva), and Kichijōten (Lakshmi).  Along with Benzaitennyo/Sarasvati and Kisshoutennyo/Laxmi and completing the nipponization of the three Hindu Tridevi goddesses, the Hindu goddess Mahakali is nipponized as the Japanese goddess Daikokutennyo (大黒天女), though she is only counted among Japan's Seven Luck Deities when she is regarded as the feminine manifestation of her male counterpart Daikokuten (大黒天).

Benzaiten arrived in Japan during the 6th through 8th centuries, mainly via the Chinese translations of the Sutra of Golden Light (金光明経), which has a section devoted to her. She is also mentioned in the Lotus Sutra.  In Japan, the lokapālas take the Buddhist form of the Four Heavenly Kings (四天王). The Sutra of Golden Light became one of the most important sutras in Japan because of its fundamental message, which teaches that the Four Heavenly Kings protect the ruler who governs his country in the proper manner.  The Hindu god of death, Yama, is known in his Buddhist form as Enma. Garuda, the mount (vahana) of Vishnu, is known as the Karura (迦楼羅), an enormous, fire-breathing creature in Japan. It has the body of a human and the face or beak of an eagle. Tennin originated from the apsaras.  The Hindu Ganesha (see Kangiten) is displayed more than Buddha in a temple in Futako Tamagawa, Tokyo.  Other examples of Hindu influence on Japan include the belief of "six schools" or "six doctrines" as well as use of Yoga and pagodas. Many of the facets of Hindu culture which have influenced Japan have also influenced Chinese culture.

People have written books on the worship of Hindu gods in Japan. Even today, it is claimed Japan encourages a deeper study of Hindu Gods.

Present
Hinduism is practiced mainly by the Indian and Nepali migrants, although there are others. As of 2022, there are 40,752 Indians and 125,798 Nepalis in Japan. Most of them are Hindus. Hindu gods are still revered by many Japanese particularly in Shingon Buddhism.
The few Hindu temples in Japan are as follows:
 Shiva Shakti Temple and Ashram, Tokyo
 Shirdi Sai Baba Tokyo Temple
 ISKCON New Gaya
 Benzaitensama Shrine (Saraswati Shrine)
 Ganesha Temple, Asakusa

Demographics
According to the Association of Religion Data Archives, there were     
451,678 Hindus in Japan in 2022.

See also
 Buddhist Tenbu (天部) deities
 Religion in Japan

References

Notes

External links

 Hare Krishna temple in Japan

 
Religion in Japan
Japan